The Inspector General is a 1949 American Technicolor musical comedy film, suggested by the play by Nikolai Gogol. It stars Danny Kaye and was directed by Henry Koster. The film also stars Walter Slezak, Barbara Bates, and Elsa Lanchester. Original music and lyrics are by the associate producer Sylvia Fine, who was married to Danny Kaye, with Johnny Green credited for musical direction and incidental score.

Premise
The film is loosely based on Nikolai Gogol's play The Inspector General. The plot is re-located from the Russian Empire into an unspecified corrupted region of a European country that suddenly finds itself under the supervision of the First French Empire.

Plot
Georgi (Danny Kaye), an illiterate member of a wandering band of Gypsies led by Yakov (Walter Slezak) escapes from a travelling medicine show after he innocently lets slip that the elixir they're selling is a fraud. Tired and hungry, he wanders into the small town of Brodny and whilst trying to sample the contents of a horse's feedbag, he's arrested as a vagrant and sentenced to hang the next day by a corrupt police chief (Alan Hale), desperate to prove his efficiency.

The town is run by a corrupt Mayor (Gene Lockhart), whose employees and councillors are all his cousins and equally corrupt and incompetent, but they are frightened when they learn that the Inspector General is in their neighborhood, and probably in disguise. The band of officials and the mayor want to protect their town and their lives, so, acting foolishly they seal off every road to keep the inspector from entering their town. They mistake Georgi for the Inspector and ply him with food and drink whilst plotting to have him killed. Yakov wanders into the small town and convinces Georgi to stay on as an inspector general and accept the bribes the officials so willingly throw at him. Of course, Yakov wants to seize Georgi's misfortune and turn it into a new start for his own life.

Meanwhile, hearing tales of his legacy and courageous efforts the mayor's wife instantly takes a liking to Georgi, hoping he will fall in love with her and whisk her away from the mayor and his lack of attention to her. However Georgi has fallen in love with a servant and wishes to marry her.

Naturally, their plans go awry and Georgi, despite his innocence, discovers how corrupt they really are. And when the real Inspector arrives suddenly, he also realizes that Georgi is the most honest fellow he's met since leaving Budapest. The Inspector General names Georgi the new Mayor of Brodny and presents him the mayoral gold chain, having taken it from the old mayor saying, "We'll put something else around your neck." Yakov becomes the new chief of police and Georgi gets the girl of his dreams.

Cast

Danny Kaye as Georgi
Walter Slezak as Yakov
Barbara Bates as Leza
Elsa Lanchester as Maria
Gene Lockhart as The Mayor
Alan Hale as Kovatch
Walter Catlett as Colonel Castine
Rhys Williams as Inspector General

Score
Johnny Green won a Golden Globe for Best Motion Picture Score for his work on the film. Kaye's wife Sylvia Fine wrote the original songs "The Inspector General" and "Happy Times," both sung by Kaye in the film.  "Happy Times" was, in fact, the working title of the film.

Reception

Box Office
According to Warner Bros records the film earned $2,154,000 domestically and $1,756,000 foreign.

Copyright status
The Inspector General is one of a number of major Hollywood productions from the 1940s and 1950s that have lapsed into the public domain in the United States.  The last copyright holder was United Artists Television (later Metro-Goldwyn-Mayer, and finally Turner Entertainment) and later absorbed by TimeWarner now WarnerMedia & Warner Bros.

See also
 List of films in the public domain in the United States
 Revizor (film)

References

External links

 
 
 
 
 

1949 films
1949 musical comedy films
American musical comedy films
Films based on The Government Inspector
Films directed by Henry Koster
Warner Bros. films
Films scored by Johnny Green
Films with screenplays by Harry Kurnitz
Films with screenplays by Ben Hecht
1940s English-language films
1940s American films